The South Stoa I of Athens was located on the south side of the Agora, in Athens, Greece, between the Heliaia and the Enneakrounos, a southeastern fountain house. It was built around 425–400 BC (during the Classical Era). The stoa was in use until c. 150 BC, when it was replaced by South Stoa II (of Athens).

Archaeologists also theorize that the stoa may have had a second story. The two-aisled stoa opened north, with a Doric outer colonnade, an inner colonnade of unknown order and sixteen rooms which lined the southern wall. Of the sixteen rooms, one narrow room must have served as a vestibule, while the other fifteen square rooms were probably used for public dining. The rooms were outfitted for city magistrates fed at public expense.

Buildings and structures completed in the 5th century BC
Ancient Greek buildings and structures in Athens
Former buildings and structures in Greece
Colonnades
Ancient Agora of Athens
Stoas in Greece